Abercrombie Quartet is an album by jazz guitarist John Abercrombie that was released by ECM in 1980.

Reception
The Allmusic review gave the album 2½ stars.

Track listing

Personnel
John Abercrombie – guitar, mandolin
Richie Beirach – piano
George Mraz – double bass
Peter Donald – drums

References

ECM Records albums
John Abercrombie (guitarist) albums
1980 albums
Albums produced by Manfred Eicher